Megan Taylor Harvey is an American voice actress who is known for providing voices for English dubs of anime for New Generation Pictures and NYAV Post.

Roles

Anime

Film

Video games

Animation

Movies

References

External links

Living people
American child actresses
American voice actresses
Year of birth missing (living people)
Place of birth missing (living people)